Clarence Wallace  (June 22, 1893 – November 12, 1982) was a Canadian shipbuilder and the 18th Lieutenant Governor of British Columbia.

Born in Vancouver, British Columbia, he fought in World War I and was wounded at Ypres. After the war, he became the president of his father's business, Burrard Dry Dock. During World War II, he built ships for the war and was appointed a Commander of the Order of the British Empire in 1946. From 1950 to 1955, he was the Lieutenant-Governor of British Columbia. He was appointed a Knight of Grace of the Order of St. John of Jerusalem.

He died at his winter residence in Palm Desert, California in 1982.

References
 

1893 births
1982 deaths
Canadian shipbuilders
Commanders of the Order of the British Empire
Knights of Grace of the Order of St John
Lieutenant Governors of British Columbia
Canadian military personnel of World War I
People from Vancouver